The UK Singles Chart is one of many music charts compiled by the Official Charts Company that calculates the best-selling singles of the week in the United Kingdom. Before 2004, the chart was only based on the sales of physical singles. This list shows singles that peaked in the Top 10 of the UK Singles Chart during 1999, as well as singles which peaked in 1998 and 2000 but were in the top 10 in 1999. The entry date is when the song appeared in the top 10 for the first time (week ending, as published by the Official Charts Company, which is six days after the chart is announced).

Two hundred and three singles were in the top ten in 1999. Nine singles from 1998 remained in the top 10 for several weeks at the beginning of the year, while "Mr. Hankey, the Christmas Poo" by Mr. Hankey, "Say You'll Be Mine"/"Better the Devil You Know" by Steps and "Two in a Million"/"You're My Number One" by S Club 7 were all released in 1999 but did not reach their peak until 2000. "Chocolate Salty Balls (P.S. I Love You)" by Chef and Heartbeat"/"Tragedy" by Steps were the singles from 1998 to reach their peak in 1999. Forty-eight artists scored multiple entries in the top 10 in 1999. Christina Aguilera, Britney Spears, Eminem, Jennifer Lopez, S Club 7 and Westlife were among the many artists who achieved their first UK charting top 10 single in 1999.

The first number-one single of the year was "Chocolate Salty Balls (P.S. I Love You)" by Chef, the South Park character voiced by Isaac Hayes. Overall, thirty-six different singles peaked at number-one in 1999, with Westlife (4) having the most singles hit that position.

Background

Multiple entries
Two-hundred and three singles charted in the top 10 in 1999, with one-hundred and ninety-three singles reaching their peak this year.

Forty-eight artists scored multiple entries in the top 10 in 1999. Steps had the most top 10 singles in 1999 with seven entries. Seven artists recorded four singles which reached the top 10 this year: Another Level, B*Witched, Melanie C, Ronan Keating, Vengaboys, Westlife and Will Smith.

Britney Spears was one of nine artists with three top 10 entries, including the number-one single "...Baby One More Time". A1, Boyzone, Geri Halliwell, Honeyz, Lolly, Martine McCutcheon, S Club 7 and TQ were among the other artists who had multiple top 10 entries in 1999.

Chart debuts
Seventy-three artists achieved their first top 10 single in 1999, either as a lead or featured artist. Of these, twelve went on to record another hit single that year: Alice DeeJay, ATB, Basement Jaxx, Cartoons, Eminem, Glamma Kid, Jennifer Lopez, NSYNC, The Offspring, Phats & Small, Shanks & Bigfoot, Travis, A1, Britney Spears, Lolly, Martine McCutcheon, S Club 7 and TQ all had two more top 10 singles in 1999. Westlife had three other entries in their breakthrough year.

The following table (collapsed on desktop site) does not include acts who had previously charted as part of a group and secured their first top 10 solo single.

Notes
Geri Halliwell left Spice Girls in 1999 and recorded her debut solo single, "Look at Me", peaking at number 2. She also had two further entries this year - "Mi Chico Latino" and "Lift Me Up" both topped the chart. Her former bandmate Emma Bunton lent her talents to Tin Tin Out's "What I Am", steering the song to number two. Maire Brennan was in the line-up of Clannad who scored their first and only top 10 single in 1981 with "Theme from Harry's Game". She appeared on Chicane's "Saltwater" as a featured artist in 1999.

"When You Say Nothing at All" was Ronan Keating's first chart entry separate from Boyzone, who he also had three hit singles with this year. Shanks & Bigfoot were originally known as Doolally. "Straight from the Heart" peaked at number 20 under this name in 1998 but its re-release made the top 10 in 1999. Jordan Knight of New Kids on the Block kicked off his solo career in 1999 with his sole top 10 hit, "Give It to You", making number five.

Oasis singer Liam Gallagher and Steve Cradock from Ocean Colour Scene both appeared on Buffalo Tom's "Going Underground"/"Carnation". In both cases it was their first recording independent of their bands to make the top 10.

Songs from films
Original songs from various films entered the top 10 throughout the year. These included "From the Heart" and "When You Say Nothing at All" (from Notting Hill) and "Wild Wild West" (Wild Wild West).

Best-selling singles
Britney Spears had the best-selling single of the year with "...Baby One More Time". The song spent weeks in the top 10 (including weeks at number one), sold over 1.445 million copies and was certified 2× platinum by the BPI. "Blue (Da Ba Dee)" by Eiffel 65 came in second place, selling more than 956,000 copies and losing out by around 489,000 sales. Cliff Richard's "The Millennium Prayer", "Mambo No. 5 (A Little Bit of...)" from Lou Bega and "9PM (Till I Come)" by ATB made up the top five. Singles by Ricky Martin, Shania Twain, Shanks & Bigfoot, Mr. Oizo and Christina Aguilera were also in the top ten best-selling singles of the year.

"...Baby One More Time" (8) also ranked in the top 10 best-selling singles of the decade.

Top-ten singles

Entries by artist

The following table shows artists who achieved two or more top 10 entries in 1999, including singles that reached their peak in 1998 or 2000. The figures include both main artists and featured artists, while appearances on ensemble charity records are also counted for each artist.

Notes

 "Two in a Million"/"You're My Number One" reached its peak of number two on 8 January 2000.
 "Mr. Hankey, the Christmas Poo" reached its peak of number four on 1 January 2000.
 "Miami" re-entered the top 10 at number 9 on 2 January 1999 (week ending).
 Released as the official single for Children in Need in 1998.
 "1999" originally peaked outside the top 10 at number 25 upon its initial release in 1983. It was re-released in 1985, and made the top 10 for the first time, peaking at number 2.
 Released as the official single for Comic Relief.
 "No Scrubs" re-entered the top 10 at number 8 on 17 April 1999 (week ending).
 "Thank ABBA for the Music" was a medley of ABBA songs first performed at the 1999 BRIT Awards to celebrate the release of the Mamma Mia musical. It featured the groups B*Witched, Cleopatra and Steps and solo artists Billie and Tina Cousins.
 "Say It Again" was the United Kingdom's entry at the Eurovision Song Contest in 1999.
 "My Love Is Your Love" re-entered the top 10 at number 10 on 21 August 1999 (week ending).
 "Straight From the Heart" originally peaked at number 20 upon its initial release in 1998.
 "Straight from the Heart" is credited to Doolally, the original name by which Shanks & Bigfoot were known. "Sweet Like Chocolate" entered the top 10 under their new name.
 "Back In My Life" re-entered the top 10 at number 10 on 1 January 2000 (week ending).
 Released as the official single for Children in Need.
 "Barber's Adagio For Strings" re-entered the top 10 at number 7 on 15 January 2000 (week ending).
 "Steal My Sunshine" re-entered the top 10 at number 9 on 15 January 2000 (week ending).
 "Imagine" was first released as a single in the UK in 1975 and made the top 10, peaking at number 6. Following John Lennon's death in December 1980, it re-entered the top 10 and spent four weeks at number one in January 1981.
 Figure includes song that first charted in 1998 but peaked in 1999.
 Figure includes appearance on Denise & Johnny's "Especially for You".
 Figure includes an appearance on the group medley single "Thank ABBA for the Music".
 Figure includes song that peaked in 1998.
 Figure includes song that peaked in 2000.
 Figure includes a top 10 hit with the group Spice Girls.
 Figure includes appearance on Bryan Adams' "When You're Gone".
 Figure includes three top 10 hits with the group Boyzone.
 Figure includes appearance on Tatyana Ali's "Boy You Knock Me Out".
 Figure includes appearance on Another Level's "Summertime".
 Figure includes appearance on Will Smith's "Wild Wild West".
 Figure includes appearance on Tin Tin Out's "What I Am".

See also
1999 in British music
List of number-one singles from the 1990s (UK)

References

External links
1999 singles chart archive at the Official Charts Company (click on relevant week)
Official Top 40 best-selling songs of 1999 at the Official Charts Company

United Kingdom
Top 10 singles
1999